The qualification of AFC Youth Championship 1996 was held from 13 May to 28 August.

Group 1
All match played in Al-Ain, United Arab Emirates from 24 to 28 August.

Group 2
All match played in Doha, Qatar from 25 to 29 July.

Group 3
All matches played in Al-Hasa, Saudi Arabia from 15 to 19 May.

Group 4
All match played in Damascus, Syria from 24 to 28 April.

Group 5
All match played in Kannur, India from 9 to 13 July.

Group 6
Both match played in Malé, Maldives from 27 to 29 July.

Group 7
All match played in Bangkok, Thailand from 13 to 17 May.

Group 8
All match played in Baoding, China PR from 19 to 22 June.

Group 9
All match played in Bandar Seri Begawan, Brunei from 21 to 25 June.

Qualified teams
Total 10 teams qualified for 1996 AFC Youth Championship.
  (host nation)
 
 
 
 
 
 
 
 
 

1996 qualification
Qual